Kinesiology is the scientific study of human body movement. Kinesiology addresses physiological, anatomical, biomechanical, pathological, neuropsychological principles and mechanisms of movement. Applications of kinesiology to human health include biomechanics and orthopedics; strength and conditioning; sport psychology; motor control; skill acquisition and motor learning; methods of rehabilitation, such as physical and occupational therapy; and sport and exercise physiology. Studies of human and animal motion include measures from motion tracking systems, electrophysiology of muscle and brain activity, various methods for monitoring physiological function, and other behavioral and cognitive research techniques.

Basics 
Kinesiology studies the science of human movement, performance, and function by applying the fundamental sciences of Cell Biology, Molecular Biology, Chemistry, Biochemistry, Biophysics, Biomechanics, Biomathematics, Biostatistics, Anatomy, Physiology, Exercise Physiology, Pathophysiology, Neuroscience, and Nutritional science. A bachelor's degree in kinesiology can provide strong preparation for graduate study in biomedical research, as well as in professional programs, such as medicine, dentistry, physical therapy, and occupational therapy.

Whereas the term "kinesiologist" is neither a licensed nor professional designation in the United States nor most countries (with the exception of Canada), individuals with training in this area can teach physical education, work as personal trainers and sport coaches, provide consulting services, conduct research and develop policies related to rehabilitation, human motor performance, ergonomics, and occupational health and safety. In North America, kinesiologists may study to earn a Bachelor of Science, Master of Science, or Doctorate of Philosophy degree in Kinesiology or a Bachelor of Kinesiology degree, while in Australia or New Zealand, they are often conferred an Applied Science (Human Movement) degree (or higher). Many doctoral level faculty in North American kinesiology programs received their doctoral training in related disciplines, such as neuroscience, mechanical engineering, psychology, and physiology.

In 1965, the University of Massachusetts Amherst created the United States' first Department of Exercise Science (now called Kinesiology) under the leadership of visionary researchers and academicians in the field of exercise science. In 1967, the University of Waterloo launched Canada's first kinesiology department.

Principles

Adaptation through exercise 

Adaptation through exercise is a key principle of kinesiology that relates to improved fitness in athletes as well as health and wellness in clinical populations. Exercise is a simple and established intervention for many movement disorders and musculoskeletal conditions due to the neuroplasticity of the brain and the adaptability of the musculoskeletal system. Therapeutic exercise has been shown to improve neuromotor control and motor capabilities in both normal and pathological populations.

There are many different types of exercise interventions that can be applied in kinesiology to athletic, normal, and clinical populations. Aerobic exercise interventions help to improve cardiovascular endurance. Anaerobic strength training programs can increase muscular strength, power, and lean body mass. Decreased risk of falls and increased neuromuscular control can be attributed to balance intervention programs. Flexibility programs can increase functional range of motion and reduce the risk of injury.

As a whole, exercise programs can reduce symptoms of depression and risk of cardiovascular and metabolic diseases. Additionally, they can help to improve quality of life, sleeping habits, immune system function, and body composition.

The study of the physiological responses to physical exercise and their therapeutic applications is known as exercise physiology, which is an important area of research within kinesiology.

Neuroplasticity 

Neuroplasticity is also a key scientific principle used in kinesiology to describe how movement and changes in the brain are related. The human brain adapts and acquires new motor skills based on this principle. The brain can be exposed to new stimuli and experiences and therefore learn from them and create new neural pathways hence leading to brain adaptation. These new adaptations and skills include both adaptive and maladaptive brain changes.

Adaptive plasticity

Recent empirical evidence indicates the significant impact of physical activity on brain function; for example, greater amounts of physical activity are associated with enhanced cognitive function in older adults. The effects of physical activity can be distributed throughout the whole brain, such as higher gray matter density and white matter integrity after exercise training, and/or on specific brain areas, such as greater activation in prefrontal cortex and hippocampus. Neuroplasticity is also the underlying mechanism of skill acquisition. For example, after long-term training, pianists showed greater gray matter density in sensorimotor cortex and white matter integrity in the internal capsule compared to non-musicians.

Maladaptive plasticity

Maladaptive plasticity is defined as neuroplasticity with negative effects or detrimental consequences in behavior. Movement abnormalities may occur among individuals with and without brain injuries due to abnormal remodeling in central nervous system. Learned non-use is an example commonly seen among patients with brain damage, such as stroke. Patients with stroke learned to suppress paretic limb movement after unsuccessful experience in paretic hand use; this may cause decreased neuronal activation at adjacent areas of the infarcted motor cortex.

There are many types of therapies that are designed to overcome maladaptive plasticity in clinic and research, such as constraint-induced movement therapy (CIMT), body weight support treadmill training (BWSTT) and virtual reality therapy. These interventions are shown to enhance motor function in paretic limbs and stimulate cortical reorganization in patients with brain damage.

Motor redundancy 

Motor redundancy is a widely used concept in kinesiology and motor control which states that, for any task the human body can perform, there are effectively an unlimited number of ways the nervous system could achieve that task. This redundancy appears at multiple levels in the chain of motor execution:

 Kinematic redundancy means that for a desired location of the endpoint (e.g. the hand or finger), there are many configurations of the joints that would produce the same endpoint location in space.
 Muscle redundancy means that the same net joint torque could be generated by many different relative contributions of individual muscles.
 Motor unit redundancy means that for the same net muscle force could be generated by many different relative contributions of motor units within that muscle.

The concept of motor redundancy is explored in numerous studies, usually with the goal of describing the relative contribution of a set of motor elements (e.g. muscles) in various human movements, and how these contributions can be predicted from a comprehensive theory. Two distinct (but not incompatible) theories have emerged for how the nervous system coordinates redundant elements: simplification and optimization. In the simplification theory, complex movements and muscle actions are constructed from simpler ones, often known as primitives or synergies, resulting in a simpler system for the brain to control. In the optimization theory, motor actions arise from the minimization of a control parameter, such as the energetic cost of movement or errors in movement performance.

Scope of practice 
In Canada, kinesiology is a professional designation as well as an area of study. In the province of Ontario the scope has been officially defined as, "the assessment of human movement and performance and its rehabilitation and management to maintain, rehabilitate or enhance movement and performance"

Kinesiologists work in a variety of roles as health professionals. They work as rehabilitation providers in hospitals, clinics and private settings working with populations needing care for musculoskeletal, cardiac and neurological conditions. They provide rehabilitation to persons injured at work and in vehicular accidents. Kinesiologists also work as functional assessment specialists, exercise therapists, ergonomists, return to work specialists, case managers and medical legal evaluators. They can be found in hospital, long-term care, clinic, work, and community settings. Additionally, kinesiology is applied in areas of health and fitness for all levels of athletes, but more often found with training of elite athletes.

Licensing and regulation

Canada 
In Canada, kinesiology has been designated a regulated health profession in Ontario. Kinesiology was granted the right to regulate in the province of Ontario in the summer of 2007 and similar proposals have been made for other provinces. The College of Kinesiologists of Ontario achieved proclamation on April 1, 2013, at which time the professional title "Kinesiologist" became protected by law. In Ontario only members of the college may call themselves a Registered Kinesiologist. Individuals who have earned degrees in kinesiology can work in research, the fitness industry, clinical settings, and in industrial environments. They also work in cardiac rehabilitation, health and safety, hospital and long-term care facilities and community health centers just to name a few.

Health service 

 Health promotion
 Kinesiologists working in the health promotion industry work with individuals to enhance the health, fitness, and well-being of the individual. Kinesiologists can be found working in fitness facilities, personal training/corporate wellness facilities, and industry.
 Clinical/rehabilitation
 Kinesiologists work with individuals with disabling conditions to assist in regaining their optimal physical function. They work with individuals in their home, fitness facilities, rehabilitation clinics, and at the worksite. They also work alongside physiotherapists and occupational therapists.
 Ergonomics
 Kinesiologists work in industry to assess suitability of design of workstations and provide suggestions for modifications and assistive devices.
 Health and safety
 Kinesiologists are involved in consulting with industry to identify hazards and provide recommendations and solutions to optimize the health and safety of workers.
 Disability management/case coordination
 Kinesiologists recommend and provide a plan of action to return an injured individual to their optimal function in all aspects of life.
 Management/research/administration
 Kinesiologists frequently fulfill roles in all above areas, perform research, and manage businesses.
 Health education
 Kinesiologists working in health education teach people about behaviors that promote wellness. They develop and implement strategies to improve the health of individuals and communities. Community health workers collect data and discuss health concerns with members of specific populations or communities.
 Athletic training
 Kinesiologists working in athletic training work in cooperation with physicians. Athletic trainers strive to prevent athletes from suffering injuries, diagnose them if they have suffered an injury and apply the appropriate treatment.
 Athletic coaches and scouts
 Kinesiologists who pursue a career as an athletic coach develop new talent and guide an athlete's progress in a specific sport. They teach amateur or professional athletes the skills they need to succeed at their sport. Many coaches are also involved in scouting. Scouts look for new players and evaluate their skills and likelihood for success at the college, amateur, or professional level.
 Physical education teacher
 Kinesiologists working as physical education teachers are responsible for teaching fitness, sports and health. They help students stay both mentally and physically fit by teaching them to make healthy choices.
 Physical therapy
Kinesiologists working in physical therapy diagnose physical abnormalities, restore mobility to the client, and promote proper function of joints.

History of kinesiology 

Royal Central Institute of Gymnastics (sv) G.C.I. was founded 1813 in Stockholm, Sweden by Pehr Henrik Ling. It was the first Physiotherapy school in the world, training hundreds of medical gymnasts who spread the Swedish physical therapy around the entire world.
In 1887, Sweden was the first country in the world to give a national state licence to physiotherapists/physical therapists.

The Swedish medical gymnast and kinesiologist Carl August Georgii (sv), Professor at the Royal Gymnastic Central Institute GCI in Stockholm, was the one who created and coined the new international word Kinesiology in 1854.
The term Kinesiology is a literal translation to Greek+English from the original Swedish word Rörelselära, meaning "Movement Science". It was the foundation of the Medical Gymnastics, the original Physiotherapy and Physical Therapy, developed for over 100 years in Sweden (starting 1813).

The new medical therapy created in Sweden was originally called Rörelselära (sv), and later in 1854 translated to the new and invented international word "Kinesiology". The Kinesiology consisted of nearly 2,000 physical movements and 50 different types of massage therapy techniques.
They were all used to affect various dysfunctions and even illnesses, not only in the movement apparatus, but also into the internal physiology of man.
Thus, the original classical and Traditional Kinesiology was not only a system of rehabilitation for the body, or biomechanics like in modern Academic Kinesiology, but also a new therapy for relieving and curing diseases, by affecting the autonomic nervous system, organs and glands in the body.,

In 1886, the Swedish Medical Gymnast Nils Posse (1862-1895) introduced the term kinesiology in the U.S. Nils Posse was a graduate of the Royal Gymnastic Central Institute in Stockholm, Sweden and founder of the Posse Gymnasium in Boston, MA. He was teaching at Boston Normal School of Gymnastics BNSG.
The Special Kinesiology Of Educational Gymnastics was the first book ever written in the world with the word "Kinesiology" in the title of the book. It was written by Nils Posse and published in Boston, 1894–1895. Posse was elected posthumously as an Honorary Fellow in Memoriam in the National Academy of Kinesiology.

The National Academy of Kinesiology was formally founded in 1930 in the United States. The Academy's dual purpose is to encourage and promote the study and educational applications of the art and science of human movement and physical activity and to honor by election to its membership persons who have directly or indirectly contributed significantly to the study of and/or application of the art and science of human movement and physical activity. Membership in the National Academy of Kinesiology is by election and those elected are known as Fellows. Fellows are elected from around the world. Election into the National Academy of Kinesiology is considered a pinnacle achievement and recognition with the discipline. For further information see: http://nationalacademyofkinesiology.org

Technology in kinesiology 
Motion capture technology has application in measuring human movement, and thus kinesiology. Historically, motion capture labs have recorded high fidelity data. While accurate and credible, these systems can come at high capital and operational costs. Modern-day systems have increased accessibility to mocap technology.

See also 

 Anatomical terms of motion
 Exercise physiology
 Human musculoskeletal system
 Kinanthropometry
 Kinesiogenomics
 Mental practice of action
 Motor imagery
 Movement assessment
 Neurology
 Physical therapy (USA)
 Sports science

References

External links 

Ergonomics
Applied sciences
Human physiology
Motor control
Exercise physiology